The men's 1000 metres race of the 2015 World Single Distance Speed Skating Championships was held on 14 February 2015.

Results
The race was started at 15:42.

References

Men's 1000 metres